Heliophanus comorensis is a jumping spider species in the genus Heliophanus.  It was first described in 2012 and is found in the Comoro Islands.

References

Salticidae
Spiders of Africa
Spiders described in 2012